Vectra AI, Inc. is a cybersecurity company headquartered in San Jose, California.

History 

Vectra was founded in 2010 as TraceVector LLC in New York City and was incorporated in 2012 under the name Vectra Networks.

References 

Companies based in San Jose, California
American companies established in 2012
Computer security companies
Networking companies of the United States
AI companies